is a Japanese sport shooter who competed in the 1984 Summer Olympics and in the 1992 Summer Olympics.

References

1955 births
Living people
Japanese female sport shooters
ISSF rifle shooters
Olympic shooters of Japan
Shooters at the 1984 Summer Olympics
Shooters at the 1992 Summer Olympics
Shooters at the 1986 Asian Games
Shooters at the 1990 Asian Games
Asian Games medalists in shooting
Asian Games silver medalists for Japan
Asian Games bronze medalists for Japan
Medalists at the 1986 Asian Games
Medalists at the 1990 Asian Games
20th-century Japanese women